Saint George Bay, also known as the Bay of Beirut, is located on the northern coast of the city of Beirut in Lebanon. The Beirut River empties into the bay.

Etymology
The bay is named after Saint George, a popular saint among Christian sects in the eastern Mediterranean.

Location
The bay is situated north of Beirut and runs from the Cape of Ras Beirut, extending eastward and then northward until it reaches the marina of Dbayeh. High-rise apartment buildings and hotels overlook the bay and its palm-lined promenade, the Corniche. The Port of Beirut occupies the eastern part of the bay, as does the marina and the famous landmark, the Saint George Hotel. The hotel's name derives from the bay.

Legend
According to legend, the bay is where Saint George slew the dragon at a grotto with seven caves, located at the mouth of the Beirut River. After killing the dragon, St. George washed his hands in the waters of the river, which locals believed for centuries had curative value, and so the site became popular with pilgrims, who stuck pebbles on the walls of the caves or tied cloth to the gates, and when their wishes were granted, they came back and untied the cloths.

Sporting events
The bay hosted the world sailing championships in the Fireball class in 1971 and was the scene of an annual international water ski championship from 1955 until the beginning of the war.

References

External links 

Bays of Lebanon
Beirut
Tourist attractions in Beirut